2285 Ron Helin, provisional designation , is a stony Florian asteroid from the inner region of the asteroid belt, approximately 4 kilometers in diameter. It was discovered on 27 August 1976, by American astronomer Schelte Bus at Palomar Observatory in San Diego County, California.

Orbit and characterization 

Ron Helin is a member of the Flora family, one of the largest groups of stony asteroids in the main-belt. It orbits the Sun in the inner main-belt at a distance of 1.8–2.7 AU once every 3 years and 4 months (1,208 days). Its orbit has an eccentricity of 0.21 and an inclination of 5° with respect to the ecliptic. Its rotation period is 12 hours.

Naming 

This minor planet was named in honor of Ronald Helin, husband of American astronomer Eleanor Helin (1932–2009), in appreciation of his support of the Palomar Planet-Crossing Asteroid Survey (PCAS). The approved naming citation was published by the Minor Planet Center on 11 December 1981.

References

External links 
 Asteroid Lightcurve Database (LCDB), query form (info )
 Dictionary of Minor Planet Names, Google books
 Asteroids and comets rotation curves, CdR – Observatoire de Genève, Raoul Behrend
 Discovery Circumstances: Numbered Minor Planets (1)-(5000) – Minor Planet Center
 
 

002285
Discoveries by Schelte J. Bus
Named minor planets
19760827